Zach G. Kingsley (born January 18, 1980) is a former American soccer player.  He spent his professional career with the Seattle Sounders and the Colorado Rapids.

References

External links

Washington Huskies bio

1980 births
Living people
American soccer players
Washington Huskies men's soccer players
Seattle Sounders Select players
Seattle Sounders (1994–2008) players
Colorado Rapids players
Association football midfielders
Soccer players from Washington (state)
USL League Two players
A-League (1995–2004) players
Major League Soccer players
Sportspeople from Spokane, Washington
Hawaii Pacific Sharks women's soccer coaches
Dominican Penguins
Chaminade Silverswords men's soccer coaches